Free Voters (FW or FWG) in Germany may belong to an association of people which participates in an election without having the status of a registered political party. Usually it involves a locally organized group of voters in the form of a registered association (eV). In most cases, Free Voters campaign only at the local-government level, standing for city councils and for mayoralties. Free Voters tend to achieve their most successful electoral results in rural areas of southern Germany, appealing most to conservative voters who prefer local decisions to party politics. Free Voter groups are active in all German states.

Unlike in the other German states, the Free Voters of Bavaria have also contested state elections since 1998. In the Bavaria state election of 2008 FW obtained 10.2% of the vote and gained their first 20 seats in the Landtag. FW may have been helped by the presence in its list of Gabriele Pauli, a former member of the Christian Social Union of Bavaria. Others suggested that the cause and effect might be the other way about. In the state election of 2013 FW repeated its success, gaining 19 seats.  Then, in the 2018 Landtag elections, the Free Voters won a record 27 seats. In the 2021 Rhineland-Palatinate state election, the FW entered the Landtag there for the first time, amassing 5.4% of the vote and six seats.

Ideology and politics 
The Free Voters support devolving more power to the local level. The party is in opposition to the European Union's financial policy.

Ideologically, on the left–right spectrum, it has been described by some sources as between the Free Democratic Party and the Party of Bible-abiding Christians, and by others as between the Christian Social Union and the Alternative for Germany. Europe Elects described it as centrist.

European representation 
In the 2014 European parliament elections in Germany, the Free Voters list received 1.46% of the national vote and returned a single MEP, Ulrike Müller, who sits with the ALDE Group. The federal Free Voters association joined the European Democratic Party in October 2015.

In June 2017 Arne Gericke, who sits with European Parliament's European Conservatives and Reformists group and was elected in 2014 on the Family Party of Germany list, joined the federal association. He left it 15 months afterward for Alliance C – Christians for Germany.

Currently, in the European Parliament the Free Voters sit in the Renew Europe group with two MEPs.

In the European Committee of the Regions the Free Voters sit in the Renew Europe CoR group with one alternate member for the 2020–2025 mandate.

Federal elections results

State Parliaments (Länder) 
The Free Voters does not contest state elections in Brandenburg due to the close cooperation with the BVB/Free Voters, who only compete in the state elections in Brandenburg.

References

External links
Official website of the Bavarian FW

Political organisations based in Germany
Parties represented in the European Parliament
Centrist parties in Germany
Liberal conservative parties in Germany
European Democratic Party
Political terminology in Germany